The 2017 Pinstripe Bowl was a bowl game, a post-season American college football event that was played on December 27, 2017, at Yankee Stadium in the New York City borough of the Bronx. The eighth edition of the Pinstripe Bowl featured the Iowa Hawkeyes of the Big Ten Conference against the Boston College Eagles of the Atlantic Coast Conference. It was one of the 2017–18 bowl games concluding the 2017 FBS football season. Sponsored by the New Era Cap Company, the game was officially known as the New Era Pinstripe Bowl.

The contest was televised on ESPN, with kickoff at 5:15 PM (EST)

Team selection
The game featured the Iowa Hawkeyes against the Boston College Eagles, the first meeting between the two.  It was Boston College's second appearance in this bowl in four years and the first Pinstripe Bowl for Iowa.
.

Iowa

Boston College

Game summary

Scoring summary

Statistics

References

External links
 Box score at ESPN

Pinstripe Bowl
Pinstripe Bowl
Boston College Eagles football bowl games
Iowa Hawkeyes football bowl games
Pinstripe Bowl
Pinstripe Bowl
2010s in the Bronx